Jason Aldean is an American country music artist. His discography consists of ten studio albums—his self-titled debut (2005), Relentless (2007), Wide Open (2009), My Kinda Party (2010), Night Train (2012), Old Boots, New Dirt (2014), They Don't Know (2016), Rearview Town (2018), 9 (2019), and Macon, Georgia  (2022). He has also released a total of 38 singles, 24 of which hit number one on the US Billboard Hot Country Songs and Country Airplay charts. His first, second, third, fifth, and sixth albums are all certified platinum by the Recording Industry Association of America (RIAA) and his fourth album, My Kinda Party, is certified triple-platinum. His seventh album They Don't Know is certified Gold in Canada MC.

My Kinda Party produced his highest-charting single on the Billboard Hot 100. The song "Dirt Road Anthem" reached number 7 on the chart, and featured a studio remix with rapper Ludacris. My Kinda Party is also his first album to be certified in Canada.

His fifth album, Night Train, produced his highest-charting single on the Canadian Hot 100 in "Take a Little Ride". The album was also his first number one on the Billboard 200 and Canadian Albums Chart.

Studio albums

2000s

2010s

2020s

Extended plays

Singles

2000s

2010s

2020s

Guest singles

Promotional singles

Other charted songs

Guest appearances

 2015: "Burning Bridges" (Ludacris featuring Jason Aldean) from the album Ludaversal

Videography

Video albums

Music videos

Notes

References

Country music discographies
 
 
Discographies of American artists